The Portuguese local elections of 2009 took place on 11 October. The elections consisted of three separate elections in the 308 Portuguese municipalities, the election for the Municipal Chambers, whose winner is elected president, another election for the Municipal Assembly and a last one for the lower-level Parish Assembly, whose winner is elected parish president. This last was held separately in the more than 4,000 parishes around the country. The elections took place just two weeks after the 2009 legislative election.

The elections resulted almost in a tie between the Socialist Party and the Social Democratic Party, in which the Social Democrats lost almost 20 municipalities and also lost a considerable number of councilors. The Socialists, despite losing in number of municipal chambers, were the party that most councilors elected, a situation that has not happened since 1993 when in these elections the PSD elected more councilors than the PS but the PS elected more mayors than the PSD. The Socialists won also a decisive victory in Lisbon where the incumbent mayor, António Costa, defeated the former mayor and Prime Minister Pedro Santana Lopes by a considerable margin, 44% to 39%.

The Social Democratic Party lost some municipalities to the Socialists, but they did hold on municipalities like Porto, Vila Nova de Gaia, Sintra and Coimbra. The People's Party won only one municipality, Ponte de Lima, continuing its decline in comparison, for example, with the 36 mayors achieved in 1976.

On the left, the Democratic Unitarian Coalition, led by the Communist Party, obtained their worst result in history, winning less than 10% of the vote and losing 4 municipalities including Beja and Évora. The Left Bloc kept the presidency of its single municipality, Salvaterra de Magos.

The election was again marked by several victories of independent candidates, most of them former Socialist, Social Democratic candidates who were expelled or given no confidence by their respective parties and, even so, became mayors. The best known were Valentim Loureiro in Gondomar and Isaltino Morais in Oeiras. Fátima Felgueiras, independent candidate in Felgueiras, suffered a surprised defeat by the Social Democratic candidate after winning the election in 2005 with more than 47% of the vote.

Turnout in these election was the lowest in local election, as only 59% of the electorate cast a ballot, although the number of ballots cast in the election was the highest ever in local elections.

Parties 

The main political forces involved in the election were:

 Left Bloc (BE)
 People's Party (CDS–PP) (only in some municipalities)1
 Democratic Unity Coalition (CDU)
 Socialist Party (PS)
 Social Democratic Party (PSD) (only in some municipalities)1

1 The PSD and the CDS–PP will also form coalitions in several municipalities with the Earth Party (MPT) and the People's Monarchist Party (PPM).

Opinion polling

Results

Municipal Councils

National summary of votes and seats

|-
! rowspan="2" colspan=2 style="background-color:#E9E9E9" align=left|Parties
! rowspan="2" style="background-color:#E9E9E9" align=right|Votes
! rowspan="2" style="background-color:#E9E9E9" align=right|%
! rowspan="2" style="background-color:#E9E9E9" align=right|±pp swing
! rowspan="2" style="background-color:#E9E9E9" align=right|Candidacies
! colspan="2" style="background-color:#E9E9E9" align="center"|Councillors
! colspan="2" style="background-color:#E9E9E9" align="center"|Mayors
|- style="background-color:#E9E9E9"
! style="background-color:#E9E9E9" align="center"|Total
! style="background-color:#E9E9E9" align="center"|±
! style="background-color:#E9E9E9" align="center"|Total
! style="background-color:#E9E9E9" align="center"|±
|-
| 
|2,087,831||37.72||1.8||||921||29||132||23
|-
| 
|1,271,410||22.97||5.3||||666||76||117||21
|-
|style="width: 10px" bgcolor=#FF9900 align="center" | 
|align=left|Social Democratic / People's
|540,053||9.76||1.2||||157||21||19||1
|-
| 
|537,329||9.71||1.2||||174||29||28||4
|-
|style="width: 8px" bgcolor=gray align="center" |
|align=left|Independents
|222,494||4.02||1.6||||67||31||7||0
|-
| 
|170,772||3.09||0.0||||31||1||1||0
|-
| 
|164,396||2.97||0.0||||9||2||1||0
|-
|style="width: 9px" bgcolor=#FF9900 align="center" | 
|align=left|PSD / CDS–PP / MPT / PPM
|163,966||2.96||—||||22||—||1||—
|-
|style="width: 9px" bgcolor=#FF9900 align="center" | 
|align=left|PSD / CDS–PP / PPM
|99,811||1.80||0.1||||17||2||1||0
|- 
|style="width: 9px" bgcolor=#FF9900 align="center" | 
|align=left|PSD / CDS–PP / PPM / MPT
|69,638||1.26||0.1||||9||2||1||0
|-
| 
|14,242||0.26||0.0||||0||0||0||0
|-
| 
|11,196||0.20||0.2||||2||2||0||0
|-
| 
|6,882||0.12||0.1||||1||0.1||0||0
|-
| 
|1,953||0.04||—||||0||—||0||—
|-
|style="width: 9px" bgcolor=#FF9900 align="center" |
|align=left|PSD / CDS–PP / MPT
|1,709||0.03||0.0||||2||0||0||0
|-
| 
|1,466||0.03||0.0||||0||0||0||0
|-
| 
|1,437||0.03||—||||0||—||0||—
|-
| 
|1,204||0.02||0.0||||0||0||0||0
|-
|style="width: 10px" bgcolor=#CC0033 align="center" | 
|align=left|Labour
|758||0.01||—||||0||—||0||—
|-
|style="width: 8px" bgcolor=#0093DD align="center" |
|align=left|People's / Earth
|165||0.00||—||||0||—||0||—
|-
|style="width: 8px" bgcolor=#0093DD align="center" |
|align=left|People's / People's Monarchist
|156||0.00||—||||0||—||0||—
|-
|colspan=2 align=left style="background-color:#E9E9E9"|Total valid
|width="65" align="right" style="background-color:#E9E9E9"|5,371,842
|width="40" align="right" style="background-color:#E9E9E9"|97.05
|width="40" align="right" style="background-color:#E9E9E9"|1.3
|width="40" align="right" style="background-color:#E9E9E9"|—
|width="45" align="right" style="background-color:#E9E9E9"|2,078
|width="45" align="right" style="background-color:#E9E9E9"|32
|width="45" align="right" style="background-color:#E9E9E9"|308
|width="45" align="right" style="background-color:#E9E9E9"|0
|-
|colspan=2|Blank ballots
|94,862||1.71||0.9||colspan=6 rowspan=4|
|-
|colspan=2|Invalid ballots
|68,400||1.24||0.5
|-
|colspan=2 align=left style="background-color:#E9E9E9"|Total
|width="65" align="right" style="background-color:#E9E9E9"|5,535,104
|width="40" align="right" style="background-color:#E9E9E9"|100.00
|width="40" align="right" style="background-color:#E9E9E9"|
|-
|colspan=2|Registered voters/turnout
||9,376,707||59.03||1.9
|-
| colspan=11 align=left | Source: Comissão Nacional de Eleições, Autárquicas 2009 Resultados Oficiais
|}

Municipality map

City control
The following table lists party control in all district capitals, as well as in municipalities above 100,000 inhabitants. Population estimates from the 2001 Census.

Municipal Assemblies

National summary of votes and seats

|-
! rowspan="2" colspan=2 style="background-color:#E9E9E9" align=left|Parties
! rowspan="2" style="background-color:#E9E9E9" align=right|Votes
! rowspan="2" style="background-color:#E9E9E9" align=right|%
! rowspan="2" style="background-color:#E9E9E9" align=right|±pp swing
! rowspan="2" style="background-color:#E9E9E9" align=right|Candidacies
! colspan="2" style="background-color:#E9E9E9" align="center"|Mandates
|- style="background-color:#E9E9E9"
! style="background-color:#E9E9E9" align="center"|Total
! style="background-color:#E9E9E9" align="center"|±
|- 
| 
|align=right|2,031,783
|align=right|36.70
|align=right|1.0
|align=right|
|align=right|2,855
|align=right|61
|-
| 
|align=right|1,226,358
|align=right|22.15
|align=right|4.8
|align=right|
|align=right|2,124
|align=right|292
|-  
| 
|align=right|586,118 	 	
|align=right|10.59
|align=right|1.1
|align=right|
|align=right|651
|align=right|71
|-
|style="width: 10px" bgcolor=#FF9900 align="center" | 
|align=left|Social Democratic / People's
|align=right|518,198 	
|align=right|9.61
|align=right|1.1
|align=right|
|align=right|522
|align=right|115
|-
| 
|align=right|229,414
|align=right|4.14
|align=right|0.2
|align=right|
|align=right|139
|align=right|25
|-
|style="width: 8px" bgcolor=gray align="center" |
|align=left|Independents
|align=right| 215,794  	
|align=right| 3.90
|align=right| 1.8
|align=right| 
|align=right| 224
|align=right|103
|-
| 
|align=right|195,823
|align=right|3.54
|align=right|0.2
|align=right|
|align=right|253
|align=right|63
|-
|style="width: 9px" bgcolor=#FF9900 align="center" | 
|align=left|PSD / CDS–PP / MPT / PPM
|align=right|162,092 	  	
|align=right|2.93
|align=right|—
|align=right|
|align=right|65 
|align=right|—
|-
|style="width: 9px" bgcolor=#FF9900 align="center" | 
|align=left|PSD / CDS–PP / PPM
|align=right| 98,349 	
|align=right| 1.78
|align=right| 0.1
|align=right| 
|align=right| 60
|align=right|13
|-
|style="width: 9px" bgcolor=#FF9900 align="center" | 
|align=left|PSD / CDS–PP / PPM / MPT
|align=right| 63,584  	
|align=right|1.15
|align=right|0.1
|align=right|
|align=right|22 
|align=right|5
|-
| 
|align=right|7,432 	  	
|align=right|0.13
|align=right|0.1
|align=right| 
|align=right|0
|align=right|1
|-
| 
|align=right| 7,347
|align=right| 0.13
|align=right| 0.1
|align=right|  
|align=right| 5 
|align=right| 4
|-
| 
|align=right| 4,906 	
|align=right| 0.09
|align=right|—
|align=right|
|align=right|0 
|align=right|—
|-
| 
|align=right| 1,741 	 	
|align=right| 0.03
|align=right|—
|align=right|
|align=right|0
|align=right|—
|-
|style="width: 9px" bgcolor=#FF9900 align="center" |
|align=left|PSD / CDS–PP / MPT
|align=right| 1,627
|align=right| 0.03
|align=right| 0.0
|align=right| 
|align=right| 6 
|align=right| 0
|-
| 
|align=right| 1,591 		 	
|align=right| 0.03
|align=right|—
|align=right|
|align=right|0
|align=right|—
|-
| 
|align=right| 1,300 	
|align=right| 0.02
|align=right| 0.0
|align=right| 
|align=right| 5
|align=right| 0
|-
|style="width: 10px" bgcolor=#CC0033 align="center" | 
|align=left|Labour
|align=right| 828	 	
|align=right| 0.01
|align=right|—
|align=right|
|align=right|0
|align=right|—
|-
|style="width: 8px" bgcolor=#0093DD align="center" |
|align=left|People's / Earth
|align=right| 257	 	
|align=right| 0.00
|align=right|—
|align=right|
|align=right|0
|align=right|—
|-
|style="width: 8px" bgcolor=#0093DD align="center" |
|align=left|People's / People's Monarchist
|align=right| 205
|align=right| 0.00
|align=right|—
|align=right|
|align=right|1
|align=right|—
|-
|colspan=2 align=left style="background-color:#E9E9E9"|Total valid
|width="65" align="right" style="background-color:#E9E9E9"|5,354,747
|width="40" align="right" style="background-color:#E9E9E9"|96.73
|width="40" align="right" style="background-color:#E9E9E9"|1.3
|width="40" align="right" style="background-color:#E9E9E9"|—
|width="45" align="right" style="background-color:#E9E9E9"|6,946
|width="45" align="right" style="background-color:#E9E9E9"|60
|-
|colspan=2|Blank ballots
|110,888||2.00||0.9||colspan=6 rowspan=4|
|-
|colspan=2|Invalid ballots
|70,047||1.27||0.4
|-
|colspan=2 align=left style="background-color:#E9E9E9"|Total
|width="65" align="right" style="background-color:#E9E9E9"|5,535,682
|width="40" align="right" style="background-color:#E9E9E9"|100.00
|width="40" align="right" style="background-color:#E9E9E9"|
|-
|colspan=2|Registered voters/turnout
||9,376,438||59.04||1.9
|-
| colspan=11 align=left | Source: Comissão Nacional de Eleições, Autárquicas 2009 Resultados Oficiais
|}

Parish Assemblies

National summary of votes and seats

|-
! rowspan="2" colspan=2 style="background-color:#E9E9E9" align=left|Parties
! rowspan="2" style="background-color:#E9E9E9" align=right|Votes
! rowspan="2" style="background-color:#E9E9E9" align=right|%
! rowspan="2" style="background-color:#E9E9E9" align=right|±pp swing
! rowspan="2" style="background-color:#E9E9E9" align=right|Candidacies
! colspan="2" style="background-color:#E9E9E9" align="center"|Mandates
! colspan="2" style="background-color:#E9E9E9" align="center"|Presidents
|- style="background-color:#E9E9E9"
! style="background-color:#E9E9E9" align="center"|Total
! style="background-color:#E9E9E9" align="center"|±
! style="background-color:#E9E9E9" align="center"|Total
! style="background-color:#E9E9E9" align="center"|±
|-
| 
|align=right| 2,003,533
|align=right| 36.27
|align=right| 0.8
|align=right| 
|align=right| 13,736
|align=right| 253
|align=right| 1,577
|align=right| 59
|-
| 
|align=right| 1,238,620
|align=right| 22.43
|align=right| 4.2
|align=right| 
|align=right| 11,113
|align=right|1,338
|align=right| 1,530
|align=right| 193
|-  
| 
|align=right| 606,136  	 	
|align=right| 10.97
|align=right| 1.1
|align=right| 
|align=right| 2,266
|align=right| 289
|align=right| 213
|align=right| 31
|-
|style="width: 10px" bgcolor=#FF9900 align="center" | 
|align=left|Social Democratic / People's
|align=right| 508,043 	
|align=right| 9.20
|align=right| 1.6
|align=right| 
|align=right| 2,911
|align=right| 847
|align=right| 312
|align=right| 93
|-
|style="width: 8px" bgcolor=gray align="center" |
|align=left|Independents
|align=right| 338,003 	
|align=right| 6.12
|align=right| 1.6
|align=right|  
|align=right| 2,673
|align=right| 473
|align=right| 332
|align=right| 40
|-
| 
|align=right| 163,423
|align=right| 2.96
|align=right| 0.3
|align=right| 
|align=right| 235
|align=right| 6
|align=right| 4
|align=right| 1
|-
|style="width: 9px" bgcolor=#FF9900 align="center" | 
|align=left|PSD / CDS–PP / MPT / PPM
|align=right|161,398 		  	
|align=right|2.92
|align=right| —
|align=right| 
|align=right| 384
|align=right| —
|align=right| 31
|align=right| —
|-
| 
|align=right| 128,443
|align=right| 2.33
|align=right| 0.4
|align=right| 
|align=right| 693 
|align=right| 129
|align=right| 53
|align=right| 12
|-
|style="width: 9px" bgcolor=#FF9900 align="center" | 
|align=left|PSD / CDS–PP / PPM
|align=right| 96,936
|align=right| 1.76
|align=right| 0.2
|align=right| 
|align=right| 405
|align=right| 0
|align=right| 36
|align=right| 2
|-
|style="width: 9px" bgcolor=#FF9900 align="center" | 
|align=left|PSD / CDS–PP / PPM / MPT
|align=right| 62,228 	
|align=right| 1.13
|align=right| 0.7
|align=right| 
|align=right| 168
|align=right| 48
|align=right| 15
|align=right| 4
|-
| 
|align=right|8,400
|align=right|0.15
|align=right|0.1
|align=right|
|align=right|47
|align=right|24
|align=right|2
|align=right|1
|-
| 
|align=right| 3,368	
|align=right| 0.06
|align=right| 0.0
|align=right| 
|align=right| 0
|align=right| 0
|align=right| 0
|align=right|0
|-
| 
|align=right| 1,803		 	
|align=right| 0.03
|align=right| —
|align=right| 
|align=right| 0
|align=right| —
|align=right| 0
|align=right| —
|-
| 
|align=right| 1,658 	  		
|align=right|0.03
|align=right|0.1
|align=right|
|align=right|3 
|align=right|3
|align=right|0
|align=right|0
|-
|style="width: 9px" bgcolor=#FF9900 align="center" |
|align=left|PSD / CDS–PP / MPT
|align=right| 1,532 
|align=right| 0.03
|align=right| 0.0
|align=right| 
|align=right| 29 
|align=right| 3
|align=right| 2
|align=right| 0
|-
| 
|align=right| 716 	
|align=right| 0.01
|align=right| 0.1
|align=right| 
|align=right| 3 
|align=right| 3
|align=right| 0
|align=right| 0
|-
|style="width: 8px" bgcolor=#0093DD align="center" |
|align=left|People's / Earth
|align=right| 542
|align=right| 0.01
|align=right| —
|align=right| 
|align=right| 3
|align=right| —
|align=right| 0
|align=right| —
|-
|style="width: 10px" bgcolor=#CC0033 align="center" | 
|align=left|Labour
|align=right| 336
|align=right| 0.01
|align=right| —
|align=right| 
|align=right| 0
|align=right| —
|align=right| 0
|align=right| —
|-
| 
|align=right| 280
|align=right| 0.00
|align=right| 0.0
|align=right| 
|align=right| 0
|align=right| 0
|align=right| 0
|align=right| 0
|-
|style="width: 8px" bgcolor=#0093DD align="center" |
|align=left|People's / People's Monarchist
|align=right| 152
|align=right| 0.00
|align=right| —
|align=right| 
|align=right| 3
|align=right| —
|align=right| 0
|align=right| —
|-
|colspan=2 align=left style="background-color:#E9E9E9"|Total valid
|width="65" align="right" style="background-color:#E9E9E9"|5,325,550
|width="40" align="right" style="background-color:#E9E9E9"|96.41
|width="40" align="right" style="background-color:#E9E9E9"|1.1
|width="40" align="right" style="background-color:#E9E9E9"|—
|width="45" align="right" style="background-color:#E9E9E9"|34,672
|width="45" align="right" style="background-color:#E9E9E9"|—
|width="45" align="right" style="background-color:#E9E9E9"|4,107
|width="45" align="right" style="background-color:#E9E9E9"|—
|-
|colspan=2|Blank ballots
|116,243||2.10||0.7||colspan=6 rowspan=4|
|-
|colspan=2|Invalid ballots
|81,523||1.48||0.4
|-
|colspan=2 align=left style="background-color:#E9E9E9"|Total
|width="65" align="right" style="background-color:#E9E9E9"|5,523,316
|width="40" align="right" style="background-color:#E9E9E9"|100.00
|width="40" align="right" style="background-color:#E9E9E9"|
|-
|colspan=2|Registered voters/turnout
||9,360,875||59.00||1.9
|-
| colspan=11 align=left | Source: Comissão Nacional de Eleições, Autárquicas 2009 Resultados Oficiais
|}

See also
 Politics of Portugal
 List of political parties in Portugal
 Elections in Portugal

References

Notes

External links
 Official site Autárquicas 2009
 Official results site, Portuguese Justice Ministry
 Portuguese Electoral Commission

2009 elections in Portugal
2009
October 2009 events in Europe